Senator Baxter may refer to:

Alexander G. Baxter (1859–1934), New York State Senate
Charles H. Baxter (1841–?), Wisconsin State Senate
Delos W. Baxter (1857–1918), Illinois State Senate
Jeff Baxter (politician) (born 1960), Washington State Senate
Jere Baxter (1852–1904), Tennessee State Senate
Percival P. Baxter (1876–1969), Maine State Senate